The Lost River is a  tributary of the Tamarac River of northern Minnesota in the United States. Via the Tamarac River, it is a tributary of Red Lake.

See also
List of rivers of Minnesota

References

Minnesota Watersheds

USGS Hydrologic Unit Map - State of Minnesota (1974)

Rivers of Minnesota